A polynya is a non-linear area of open water surrounded by sea ice. 

Polynya may also refer to:
 Polynia (ship), a ship crushed in sea ice in 1891 and commemorated in the song Old Polina
 Kane’s Polynia, an open sea rumored to exist around the North Pole in the 19th century
 Polynia Island, an island in Canada once part of the British Arctic Territories